Cornelis de Witt (15 June 1623 – 20 August 1672) was a Dutch politician and naval officer of the Golden Age. During the First Stadtholderless Period De Witt was an influential member of the Dutch States Party, and was in opposition to the House of Orange. In the Rampjaar of 1672 he was lynched together with his brother Johan de Witt by a crowd incited by Orange partisans.

Life

De Witt family
Cornelis de Witt was a member of the old Dutch patrician family De Witt. His father was Jacob de Witt, an influential regent and burgher from the patrician class in the city of Dordrecht, which in the 17th century was one of the most important cities of the dominating province of Holland. De Witt's mother was Anna van den Corput (1599–1645), niece of Johannes Corputius, an influential Dutch military leader and cartographer. His younger brother Johan de Witt was Grand Pensionary of Holland from 1653 to 1672. His uncle Andries de Witt previously held the position of Grand Pensionary between 1619 and 1621. Through the marriage of one of his other uncles to Margaretha of Nassau, daughter of Anna Johanna of Nassau-Siegen, De Witt was a distant relative of the later Dutch governor and English King William III of Orange-Nassau. Another relationship led him to the Tromps, Maarten and his son Cornelis Tromp, both admirals of the Netherlands.

Political career 
In 1648 Cornelis de Witt became a schepen (councillor) of Dordrecht.

De Witt associated himself closely with his younger brother, the Raadpensionaris of Holland ("Grand Pensionary") Johan de Witt, and supported him throughout his career with great ability and vigour. Johan relied on his older brother for many matters of state. Johan is considered a strategist in their collaboration and Cornelis as a creative person.

Cornelis de Witt was mayor of Dordrecht in 1666 and 1667, and several times deputy of his city in the States of Holland. Between 1663–65 and 1669–71 De Witt was Committed Council of the Zuiderkwartier. In 1667 he was appointed curator of the Leiden University by the States of Holland. In 1665 the States General appointed him deputy in the field in the war with the Bishop of Munster. He acted in the same capacity in 1668, when troops were being gathered for the war between Spain and France.

In 1667 De Witt was the deputy chosen by the States of Holland to accompany Lieutenant-Admiral Michiel de Ruyter in his famous raid on the Medway. Cornelis de Witt on this occasion distinguished himself greatly by his coolness and intrepidity. He again accompanied De Ruyter in 1672 and took an honorable part in the great battle of Solebay against the united English and French fleets. Compelled by illness to leave the fleet, he found on his return to Dordrecht that the Orange party were in the ascendant, and he and his brother were the objects of popular suspicion and hatred. He was arrested on false accusations of treason, but did not confess despite heavy torture and was ultimately unlawfully condemned to be banished. He was assassinated by the same carefully organised lynch mob that killed his brother on the day he was to be released, victim of a conspiracy by the Orangists Johan Kievit and Lieutenant-Admiral Cornelis Tromp. Both their bodies were mutilated and their hearts were carved out to be exhibited as trophies. The scene was painted by Jan de Baen, the same painter who had twice painted his portrait, in The Corpses of the De Witt Brothers.

Marriage 
Cornelis de Witt married Maria van Berckel (1632–1706) in 1650. The couple had five children:
 Jacob de Witt (1653–1675). Six days after his father's murder, he set out on a journey to Germany, Geneva, Italy (where he received his doctorate in Padua in 1675) and Austria. He was unmarried and died in Vienna the same year, where he is buried.
 Johan de Witt (1660–1681); he was enrolled at the University of Leiden
 Anna de Witt (b 1667)
 Maria de Witt (b 1669), married to Arend Muys van Holy, mayor of Dordrecht
 Wilhelmina de Witt (1671–1702). She married her first cousin (the son of Johan de Witt) Johan de Witt Jr. (1662–1701), secretary of Dordrecht

In popular culture 
 Cornelis de Witt and his role in Dutch politics was depicted in the 2015 film Michiel de Ruyter.
 Both brothers play important roles in the novel The Black Tulip by Alexandre Dumas.

References

External links

1623 births
1672 deaths
17th-century Dutch politicians
Assassinated Dutch politicians
Dutch States Party politicians
Lynching deaths
Mayors of Dordrecht
People from Dordrecht
People murdered in the Netherlands
De Witt family